The 1920 All-Ireland Senior Hurling Championship was the 34th staging of the All-Ireland hurling championship since its establishment by the Gaelic Athletic Association in 1887. The championship began on 9 May 1920 and ended on 14 May 1922.

Cork were the defending champions; however, they were defeated by Dublin by 4-9 to 4-3 in the final.

The final stages of the championship were delayed due to the ongoing War of Independence.

Teams

A total of fourteen teams contested the championship, the same as the previous championship; however, there were some changes of personnel, with Westmeath replacing Laois in the Leinster Senior Hurling Championship.

Results

Leinster Senior Hurling Championship

Munster Senior Hurling Championship

All-Ireland Senior Hurling Championship

Championship statistics

Miscellaneous

 The Munster final between Cork and Limerick was originally scheduled for 29 August 1920; however, due to the hunger strike of the Lord Mayor of Cork Terence MacSwiney, the game did not take place until 2 April 1922.
 Not one of the Dublin hurling team that won the All-Ireland final was born in Dublin.

Sources

 Corry, Eoghan, The GAA Book of Lists (Hodder Headline Ireland, 2005).
 Donegan, Des, The Complete Handbook of Gaelic Games (DBA Publications Limited, 2005).

References

1920
All-Ireland Senior Hurling Championship